The Accademia di Belle Arti di Bari (English, "Academy of Fine Arts of Bari") is a public tertiary academy of art in Bari, Apulia, Italy.

Like other state art academies in Italy, the Accademia became an autonomous degree-awarding institution under law no. 508 dated 21 December 1999, and falls under the supervision of the Ministry of Education, Universities, and Research.

See also

 List of academies of fine art in Italy

References

Art schools in Italy